WSIM-LP (103.5 FM, "WSIM 103.5 FM") is a radio station licensed to serve the community of Simsbury, Connecticut. The station is owned by Simsbury Fire District. It airs a community radio format.

The station was assigned the WSIM-LP call letters by the Federal Communications Commission on January 12, 2015.

References

External links
 Official Website
 FCC Public Inspection File for WSIM-LP
 

SIM-LP
SIM-LP
Radio stations established in 2015
2015 establishments in Connecticut
Community radio stations in the United States
Hartford County, Connecticut